Marvin Senaya (born 28 January 2001) is a French professional footballer who plays as a right-back for  club Rodez on loan from Strasbourg.

Club career
Senaya began his senior career with the reserves of Strasbourg in 2019, and signed a professional contract with the senior team on 7 May 2021. On 31 August 2021, Senaya signed on loan with Sochaux for the 2020-21 season. He made his professional debut with Sochaux in a 2–0 Ligue 2 win over Paris FC on 18 September 2021.

Senaya made his Ligue 1 debut for Strasbourg on 14 August 2022 against Nice.

On 17 August 2022, Senaya joined Rodez on loan.

Personal life
Senaya is the son of the retired Togolese footballer Yao Mawuko Sènaya.

References

External links
 

2001 births
Living people
People from Saint-Maurice, Val-de-Marne
French footballers
French sportspeople of Togolese descent
Association football fullbacks
RC Strasbourg Alsace players
FC Sochaux-Montbéliard players
Rodez AF players
Ligue 1 players
Ligue 2 players
Championnat National 3 players
Footballers from Val-de-Marne